
Vagrancy Act may refer to:

United Kingdom 
 Vagabonds and Beggars Act 1494, Act of the Parliament of England
 Vagabonds Act 1530, Act of the Parliament of England
 Vagabonds Act 1547, Act of the Parliament of England
 Vagabonds Act 1572, Act of the Parliament of England
 Vagabonds Act 1597, Act of the Parliament of England
 Vagrancy Act 1824, Act of the Parliament of the United Kingdom
 Vagrancy Act 1838, Act of the Parliament of the United Kingdom
 Vagrancy Act 1855, Act of the Parliament of the United Kingdom
 Vagrancy Act 1898, Act of the Parliament of the United Kingdom
 Vagrancy Act 1935, Act of the Parliament of the United Kingdom
 Vagrancy Act 1966, Act of the Parliament of the United Kingdom
 Vagrancy Offences (Repeal) Bill (1981), proposed legislation
 Vagrancy (Amendment) Bill (1991), proposed legislation
 Vagrancy (Repeal) Bill 2017-19, proposed legislation

United States 
 Vagrancy Act 1866, Act of the United States Congress

Union of South Africa 
 Vagrancy Act 1834
 Vagrancy Act 1879

Ireland 
 Vagrancy Act 1988